NEC APC is an 8-bit character set developed by NEC for the NEC APC, a CP/M-86 and MS-DOS-compatible personal computer in 1983. These were a contemporary competitor for the IBM PC, although eclipsed by fully PC-compatible computers.

Character set 

� Not in Unicode, these are combinations of solid and dotted box lines and a mirror-image phi

See also 
NEC PC-9800 series

References

Further reading

APC
NEC personal computers